Van Galder Bus Company, legally Sam Van Galder, Inc. is a regional bus service headquartered in Janesville, Wisconsin. A subsidiary of  Coach USA, the company had been a family-owned business for over 50 years until it was sold in 1999 to the Stagecoach Group, who retained Stephen Van Galder as president under the Coach USA banner. In 2004, Van Galder acquired Rockford Coach Lines, which provided airport service from Rockford to O'Hare, from Greyhound Lines.

The company operates school buses for the Janesville School district, coach and school bus charters, tour and travel excursions, daily airport shuttles, Amtrak Thruway service to downtown Chicago, and the only intercity service on the I-39/90 corridor. The company has bus terminals in Janesville and Rockford. It picks up curbside in Madison on North Lake Street and at the Dutch Mill Park and Ride and has two pick-ups in Rockford, one on Walton Street for O'Hare customers and one on N. Lyford Street for downtown Chicago customers.  However, all buses currently only stop at the Rockford terminal on Walton Street. Service to Chicago Midway Airport was suspended March 17, 2020, and there are no plans to reinstate it.

The corridor served by Van Galder's regularly scheduled service is from:

 Madison 
 University of Wisconsin 200 block of North Lake Street (between Dayton and Johnson Streets), adjacent to the Gordon Commons terrace. (For GPS, use "250 N. Lake St".)
 Dutch Mill Park & Ride off the West Beltline Highway and Stoughton Road (Highway 51)
 Janesville (Terminal off I-39/90 and Highway 14) 
 South Beloit (Fas Mart/McDonald's on southeast corner of I-39/90 and Highway 75)
 Rockford Terminal off State Street (U.S. Route 20 Business)

to

 Chicago 
O'Hare International Airport
 Chicago Union Station

In September, 2009, the company started double-decker bus service on the route between Madison and downtown Chicago.

See also
 List of intercity bus stops in Wisconsin
 List of intercity bus stops in Illinois

References

External links
Van Galder Bus Company at Coach USA website

Bus transportation in Wisconsin
Stagecoach Group bus operators in the United States and Canada
Bus companies of the United States
Janesville, Wisconsin
1947 establishments in Wisconsin
Transportation companies based in Wisconsin